Benjamin Behrla (born 31 August 1985 in Emsdetten), known as Benny Behrla, is a German judoka.

Competing in the –100 kg weight division, Behrla won bronze medals at the 2008 and 2010 European Judo Championships. He competed at the 2008 Summer Olympics, finishing in 9th place overall.

Achievements

References

External links
 
 
 

1985 births
Living people
German male judoka
Olympic judoka of Germany
Judoka at the 2008 Summer Olympics
People from Emsdetten
Sportspeople from Münster (region)
21st-century German people
20th-century German people